Uzeir Abduramanovich Abduramanov (25 March 1916 – 19 January 1991) was a sapper in the Red Army during the Great Patriotic War. After securing the safe transfer of troops across the Sozh river under heavy enemy fire and through icy water, he was declared a Hero of the Soviet Union on 15 January 1944. Despite having served in the Red Army throughout the entire war and achieving recognition for his bravery, he was still deported to Uzbekistan in 1945 because of his Crimean Tatar ethnicity. His entire family had also suffered exile in the deportation of 1944.

Early life
Abduramanov was born on 25 March 1916 to a peasant Crimean-Tatar family in either Kashik-Degirmen or Jag'a Mamish, Crimea. After completing trade school in 1933 he worked in Simferopol until he was drafted into the Red Army in 1939.

World War II 
Abduramanov was deployed to fight in the German-Soviet war shortly after the start of Operation Barbarossa; he had previously fought in the Battle of Khalkhin Gol. He saw action in the Battle of Stalingrad before advancing on to Byelorussia. During the fighting in Novye Tereshkovichi, Gomel Region in 1943 he was one of the seventeen sappers tasked with building a bridge across the icy Sozh river for advancing Red Army troops. The crossing lasted nine hours, and only three of the sappers survived. The sappers had stayed in the ice water the entire time and continued to lay support beams even under heavy enemy artillery and machine-gun fire. For his resilience and bravery at the Sozh crossing he was declared a Hero of the Soviet Union by decree of the Supreme Soviet on 15 January 1944. He had been previously recognized for his bravery in the Sev and Desna crossings. In May his family was deported to Uzbekistan because of their Crimean Tatar ethnicity; his status as a war hero did not stop the Soviet government of declaring his family "enemies of the people". Later that year, an issue of the magazine Ogonyok included his portrait in a photo gallery of Heroes of the Soviet Union, all of different ethnicities - but the caption for Abduramanov's picture said he was Azeri, not Crimean Tatar.

Life in exile 
After the end of the war, Abduramanov was forcibly deported to Uzbekistan solely on the grounds of his Crimean Tatar ethnicity, despite having been a decorated veteran of the Red Army. His entire family was subject to the deportation in 1944, soon after which his mother died in exile. After the death of Stalin the Crimean Tatars were not permitted to return to their homeland, despite other exiled groups being given the right to return in the Khrushchev era. He never returned to his native Crimea despite being individually given permission to return since he would not be allowed to bring his whole family. As an active member of the Crimean Tatar rights movement he was frequently harassed by the KGB. After several years of poor health he died in the city of Navoiy in 1991.

Awards and honors 
Hero of the Soviet Union (1944)
Order of Lenin (1944)
Order of the Patriotic War 1st class (1985)
Medal "For Battle Merit" (1943)
campaign and jubilee medals

Footnotes

References 

1916 births
1991 deaths
People from Simferopol Raion
People from Simferopolsky Uyezd
Crimean Tatar people
Communist Party of the Soviet Union members
Soviet military personnel of World War II
Heroes of the Soviet Union
Recipients of the Order of Lenin